The 2011–12 season of the Oberliga Hamburg, the highest association football league in the German state of Hamburg, was the fourth season of the league at tier five (V) of the German football league system.



Table
The 2011–12 season saw five new clubs in the league, VfL Pinneberg, SV Halstenbek-Rellingen, SC Vier- und Marschlande, Vorwärts-Wacker Billstedt and TSV Sasel, all promoted from the Landesligas while no club had been relegated from the Regionalliga Nord to the league.

References

External links 
 German Football Association (DFB) 
 Kicker magazine 

Hamburg
Oberliga Hamburg